Ubinas District is one of eleven districts of the province General Sánchez Cerro in the Moquegua Region in Peru.

Geography 
The highest elevation in the district is the Ubinas volcano. Other mountains are listed below:

References